Staropole may refer to the following places:
Staropole, Łódź Voivodeship (central Poland)
Staropole, Lubusz Voivodeship (west Poland)
Staropole, Silesian Voivodeship (south Poland)